Delian Stateff (born 26 March 1994) is an Italian triathlete. He competed in the men's event at the 2020 Summer Olympics held in Tokyo, Japan. He also competed in the mixed relay event.

References

External links
 

1994 births
Living people
Italian male triathletes
Olympic triathletes of Italy
Triathletes at the 2020 Summer Olympics
Sportspeople from Rome
21st-century Italian people